Martin Stavrum (23 June 1938, Levanger – 30 September 2022) was a Norwegian farmer and politician for the Centre Party.

He served as a deputy representative to the Parliament of Norway from Nord-Trøndelag during the term 1993–1997. In total he met during 7 days of parliamentary session. From 1992 to 1999 he was the mayor of Levanger municipality. He died in September 2022.

References

1938 births
2022 deaths
People from Levanger
Deputy members of the Storting
Centre Party (Norway) politicians
Mayors of places in Nord-Trøndelag
20th-century Norwegian politicians